The Academy of Our Lady of Mercy, Lauralton Hall, established in 1905 by the Sisters of Mercy, is an independent, Roman Catholic, all-girls high school at 200 High Street in Milford, Connecticut, United States. It is part of the Roman Catholic Archdiocese of Hartford.

It is the oldest Catholic college-preparatory school for girls in Connecticut. In August 2011, it was added to the National Register of Historic Places by the Connecticut Historic Preservation Council.

The school's 30-acre campus is located a block from the Metro-North Railroad's Milford station.

Students attend Lauralton Hall from nearly 40 cities and towns.

Recent accomplishments 
The Lauralton Hall Engineering Team earned the highest score out of eight teams for its aircraft stability design presented engineers in the 2018 Sikorsky STEM Challenge, and defended their title in 2019, winning again. (In 2017, the LH Engineering Team was the first all-girl team to participate in - and win - the Sikorsky STEM Challenge).

The LH Field Hockey team won the 2020 S.C.C Connecticut championship. The coach, Christine Miller, and her captains (Veronica Pinho and Julia Proto) helped lead the team to success.

The LH Swim Team earned 2018 Class M State Championship and placed second in the SCC.

The LH Cheerleading Team placed first in the 2017 Class L State Championships and placed second in the SCC. In 2018, the cheer team placed second in the 2018 Class L State Championships and fifth in the 2018 New England Championships.

Notable alumnae

Rosa DeLauro, Democratic Congresswoman

See also
 National Register of Historic Places listings in New Haven County, Connecticut

References

Buildings and structures in Milford, Connecticut
Schools in New Haven County, Connecticut
Catholic secondary schools in Connecticut
Educational institutions established in 1905
Girls' schools in Connecticut
National Register of Historic Places in New Haven County, Connecticut
Sisters of Mercy schools
1905 establishments in Connecticut